Margarita Neri was a Zapatista commander and a soldadera during the Mexican Revolution. She was a Dutch-Maya Indian from the Mexican state of Quintana Roo who was one of the few female military leaders to achieve fame during the revolution.  Neri is said to have led over one thousand soldiers in 1910 through Mexico just as if she were a man earning the utmost respect of Zapata.

Further reading

References

Zapatistas
Female military personnel
Mexican people of Dutch descent
People of the Mexican Revolution
Native American women in warfare
Year of death missing
Year of birth missing
Women in war in Mexico
Women in war 1900–1945